Frederick Cecil Smollan (20 August 1908 – 8 February 1998, Johannesburg) was a South Africa international rugby union player.

Career history
Fred Smollan was born in Uitenhage, South Africa in 1908 to David Smollan and Mathilda Goldwater, the second of four brothers. Educated at Muir College and later Grey High School, Smollan was only the second Jew to represent  in rugby union, after Morris Zimerman. Smollan played club rugby for Wanderers RFC, regional rugby for Eastern Province and Transvaal and played three times for South Africa in 1933.

His three internationals were all against Australia on the team's 1933 tour of South Africa. Although he would receive no further caps, he faced international opponents again, facing the 1938 British Lions as part of the Transvaal team. Transvaal defeated the Lions 16–9, with Smollan scoring one of the tries.

In 1931 he set up a business Smollan Holdings, initially as a sales agency. With the outbreak of World War II he served in North Africa. He married Molly Amelia Raphaely in Johannesburg in 1943 and after the war returned to run his business which he built into a public company. Smollan and Molly had two children, Doug (b. 1945) and Katherine (b. 1948). Smollan Holdings expanded to become the Smollan Group, a multinational company which now employs 34,000 people and outsources marketing services across the world. Smollan remained as its chairman until shortly before his death.

See also
List of select Jewish rugby union players

References

External links
 Fred Smollan on scrum.com
 Smollan Group
 The Glory of the Game about the Ten Jewish Springboks.
 Rugby Personalities: The Jewish Springboks

1908 births
1998 deaths
Jewish rugby union players
Jewish South African sportspeople
People from Uitenhage
Rugby union flankers
Rugby union players from Johannesburg
South Africa international rugby union players
South African rugby union players
Eastern Province Elephants seasons
Golden Lions players